Count  was a diplomat and statesman during early Meiji period Japan.

Life and career
Soejima was born into a samurai family in Saga, in Hizen Province (present-day Saga Prefecture). His father was a teacher in the domain's school and a scholar of National Learning (kokugaku). In 1866, Soejima was sent to Nagasaki by the domain leaders to study the English language. There he studied under Guido Verbeck, a Dutch missionary, giving special attention to the United States Constitution and the New Testament. During the Boshin War he was a military leader of the Saga forces committed to the overthrow of the Tokugawa bakufu.

After the Meiji Restoration, Soejima became a junior councilor (san'yo) and assisted Fukuoka Takachika in drafting the structure of the provisional Meiji government in 1868. While most of Japan's government was on its around-the-world tour of the United States and Europe on the Iwakura Mission, Soejima served as interim Foreign Minister. During his term he was faced with the difficult issue of the Maria Luz Incident, involving the questions of extraterritoriality and the unequal treaties in a case involving the mistreatment of Chinese indentured laborers on a Peruvian ship. Soejima was praised by the Chinese government over his handling of the affair.

In 1871, he was sent to Siberia to adjust boundary questions relating to the island of Sakhalin.
In 1873, Soejima led a mission to Beijing to protest the murder of 54 crewmembers of a wrecked Ryūkyūan merchant vessel by Paiwan aborigines on the southwestern tip of Taiwan in December 1871. (The former Ryūkyū Kingdom had only been formally claimed by the Empire of Japan, as Japanese sovereign territory from September 1872.) Soejima succeeded in meeting with the Tongzhi Emperor partly on the basis of the goodwill extended over the Maria Luz Incident, but Japan's demands for compensation were refused, leading to the Taiwan Expedition of 1874. However, the mission to China did succeed in establishing formal diplomatic relations between Japan and China.

After the return of the Iwakura Mission and the rejection of the Seikanron proposals to invade Korea in October 1873, Soejima resigned from the government. He later joined Itagaki Taisuke and Eto Shimpei in forming the Aikoku Koto political party. On a visit to China in 1876, he was received with high honors by the mandarins by reason of his scholarship, and he became private adviser of the emperor.

Soejima returned to government service in 1878, serving in the Imperial Household Ministry. In 1888 he was appointed to the Privy Council, and became its vice chairman in 1891. In 1892, he was called upon to become Home Minister in the first Matsukata administration.

Notes

References
 Akamatsu, Paul. (1972). Meiji 1868: Revolution and Counter-Revolution in Japan. Trans. Miriam Kochan. New York: Harper & Row.
 Beasley, William G. (1972). The Meiji Restoration. Stanford: Stanford University Press. ;  OCLC 579232
 Duus, Peter. (1998). The Abacus and the Sword: The Japanese Penetration of Korea, 1895–1910. Berkeley: University of California Press. .
 Jansen, Marius B. and Gilbert Rozman, eds. (1986). Japan in Transition: from Tokugawa to Meiji. Princeton: Princeton University Press. ;  OCLC 12311985
 Ohashi, Akio. (1990). Soejima Taneomi. Tokyo: Shin Jinbutsu Oraisha.

External links 

National Diet Library bio & photo

1828 births
1905 deaths
Samurai
Kazoku
People from Saga (city)
People of Meiji-period Japan
Nabeshima retainers
Aikoku Kōtō politicians
Ministers of Home Affairs of Japan
Japanese diplomats
Japanese calligraphers
Recipients of the Order of the Rising Sun with Paulownia Flowers